The Swan is a Grade II listed pub at High Street, West Wycombe, Buckinghamshire.

It is on the Campaign for Real Ale's National Inventory of Historic Pub Interiors.

Built in the 18th century, The Swan was refitted and extended in 1932 by Wheelers Wycombe brewery. As with most of West Wycombe, it is owned by the National Trust.

References

Pubs in Buckinghamshire
Grade II listed pubs in Buckinghamshire
National Inventory Pubs